Mustapha Island is a bar island on the Ohio River in Wood County, West Virginia. It is located upstream from the Ohio's confluence with the Hocking River at Hockingport, Ohio. Locally it is known as “Sager’s Island.”

See also 
List of islands of West Virginia

References

River islands of West Virginia
Islands of Wood County, West Virginia
Islands of the Ohio River